King Field (alternately, Kingfield) is a neighborhood in the Southwest community in Minneapolis, Minnesota. Its boundaries are 36th Street to the north, Interstate 35W to the east, 46th Street to the south, and Lyndale Avenue to the west. King Field, within the King Field neighborhood is a park named after Martin Luther King Jr.

History 
King Field is named after Colonel William S. King. The neighborhood is located in Minneapolis’ Southwest community between Interstate 35W on the east and Lyndale Avenue on the west. The northern boundary is 36th Street, and the southern boundary is 46th Street.

In 1885, the southern border of the city of Minneapolis was 38th Street. By 1887 the city had expanded its borders to 54th street, and thus the area which is now King Field became part of Minneapolis. King Field is mainly a residential area with three-fourths of its single-family houses built before 1920. The King Field neighborhood has a number of amenities including churches, schools, a park named after Martin Luther King Jr., and three to four dozen small businesses.[1]

Early History of King Field 

This was farm country in the 2nd half of the 19th century. Transportation was by horse and buggy. Fewer than 20 farms had been established by 1874. C.C. Garvey owned a dairy farm near 44th Street and Grand Ave. George Bichnell farmed  of land from Lyndale to Pleasant, 42nd to 43rd Streets. Hiram Van Nest farmed  of land from 40th to 42nd, Pleasant to Lyndale.

Street Names 

The following is a list of streets in King Field, and the origin of their names:

 Blaisdell Ave. named in honor of Robert Blaisdell, Sr. and his three sons, who were early pioneers here and lumbermen on the upper Mississippi river (No Uncle Charlie, though).
 Garfield Ave. named after James Garfield, the assassinated president of the US.
 Grand Ave. from the French, meaning great, noble.
 Harriet Ave. named after the wife of Col. Leavenworth, whose maiden name was Harriet Lovejoy. (She is also the source of the name Lake Harriet). Col. Leavenworth was the first commandant of a temporary fort known in 1819 as Fort St. Anthony.
 Lyndale Avenue names after the  Lyndale farm owned by William S. King which bordered Lake Harriet and Lake Calhoun. The name for the farm was in honor of Mr. King’s father, Rev. Lyndon King.
 Pleasant Ave. as the name implies
 Pillsbury Ave. named in honor of Gov. John Pillsbury, Governor in 1875, who served for three 2-year terms. In addition to his political achievements, he was also interested in building up the state university and donated the funds for the one of its main buildings.
Wentworth Ave.
 Van Nest Ave. named after Hiram Van Nest, one of the earliest settlers in the vicinity of Saint Anthony Falls, the birthplace of Minneapolis. He invested in real estate almost as soon as Minneapolis was open to settlement.
 Nicollet Avenue commemorates Joseph N. Nicollet, geographer and explorer whose maps of the area, now Minnesota and the eastern part of North and South Dakota, were published in 1843.
 Stevens Ave. named after Col. John H. Stevens, an early pioneer in the city, who built the first permanent dwelling in Minneapolis in 1850.

Taken from “Early History of the Kingfield Neighborhood”, a new resident handout circa 1992 via Kingfield Neighborhood Association Web Site [2]

Schools 

 Barton Community School (K-5), 4237 Colfax Ave S, Minneapolis 55409 : (612) 668-3580
 Lyndale Community School (K-5), 312 West 34th Street, Minneapolis, MN 55408 : (612) 668-4000 : Map
Justice Page School (6-8), 1 West 49th Street Minneapolis, MN 55419 : (612) 668.0455 Map
Washburn Senior High School (9-12), 201 West 49th Street, Minneapolis, MN 55419-5588 : (612) 668-3400 : Map
Lake Country Montessori School  (K-8) 3755 Pleasant Ave S, Minneapolis, MN 55409 : (612) 827-3707 : Map

Businesses 
 Businesses in Kingfield

References

External links 
 Minneapolis Neighborhood Profile - King Field
 Kingfield Neighborhood Association
 Incarnation Church 
 Faith Free Lutheran Church 
 Kingfield Farmers Market
 Families Building Community
 Center For Performing Arts
 Nicollet-East Harriet Business Association(NEHBA)
 Experience Southwest : Southwest Minneapolis Business Directory (NEHBA sponsored)
 Lyndale Community School (Neighborhood K-5 Community School)
 Kingfield, Minneapolis, Minnesota Placeography

Neighborhoods in Minneapolis